Chahuis or xamoes are the common names given in Mexico to a variety of edible insects within the insect order Coleoptera. The insects' common names in English are often sticks worms, rhinoceros beetle, or just grub.

The chahuis insects feed on species of the Mesquite tree. Chahuis are consumed preferably in summer, in their last larval stage (2–3 weeks of life), since in their adult stage they have a bitter taste. They are consumed fried, roasted, stewed or in sauce, also tatemados al comal and served with salt and chili. In southern Mexico, they are eaten toasted on a comal or in a broth prepared with avocado leaf, epazote and ground corn.

Particularly appreciated are the larvae of the following families: Cerambycidae, Scarabaeidae, Melolonthidae, and Passalidae. In southern Mexico, they are eaten toasted on a comal or in a broth prepared with avocado leaf, epazote and ground corn.

Distribution
There are 88 species of Coleoptera, primarily their larvae, that are eaten in Mexico as escarabajos comestibles.  They are found in, and part of the cuisine of, the Mexican states of:
Hidalgo
Tabasco
Guerrero
Veracruz
Mexico
Oaxaca
Puebla
Distrito Federal
Nayarit
Chiapas
Michoacán

Preparation
Chahuis must be toasted well, otherwise they have a bitter flavor.

See also
Escamol — the edible larvae of ants in Mexico.

References

References

Beetles of North America
Insects of Mexico
Insects as food
Mexican cuisine
Beetles and humans